José Renan Vasconcelos Calheiros (born 16 September 1955) is a Brazilian politician and former President of the Senate of Brazil. He has represented the state of Alagoas in the senate as a member of the Brazilian Democratic Movement Party since 1 February 1995. Renan's presidency of the Brazilian Senate, a term that started 1 February 2013, was revoked on 5 December 2016 by a minister of the Brazilian Supreme Court, Marco Aurélio Mello, who said that a person under investigation could not be in the line of succession for the presidency. However the Supreme Court decided 7 December 2016 that Renan could remain senate president, without being in the succession.

Career 

On 25 May 2007, Veja magazine accused Calheiros of accepting funds from a construction industry lobbyist, to pay child support for a child from a previous extramarital affair with broadcast journalist Mônica Veloso. In trying to justify the origin of the funds, subsequent investigations into Calheiros' business dealings led to other revelations of income tax fraud and the use of a proxy to buy a stake in a radio station. Calheiros was subject to a disciplinary inquiry by the senate's ethics committee on four different counts. On 12 September 2007, the senate voted by secret ballot against impeaching Calheiros on the lobbyist funds accusation. He still faces three separate inquiries on other charges. After the vote public outrage forced congress to eliminate secret ballot voting for ethics violations, meaning Calheiros' three other inquiries, if approved by the ethics committee, will be subject to an open ballot vote in the senate floor.

On 11 October 2007, Calheiros stepped down as president of the senate, taking a 45-day leave of absence from the position. The ethics inquiries continued to progress through the senate committees.

Calheiros worked for both the Fernando Collor de Mello and Fernando Henrique Cardoso governments.

On 1 February 2013, he was again elected president of the Brazilian Senate. Due to the accusations mentioned above, many Brazilians became upset about his election and some started an online petition demanding Renan's impeachment. As of February 2013, it had been signed by more than 1.6 million Brazilians.

The Senate board (João Alberto, Sérgio Petecão, Zezé Perrella, Romero Jucá, Gladson Cameli, Vicentinho Alves) together with Renan Calheiros refused to obey an order from the Supreme Federal Court (Federal Supreme Court) to remove Calheiros from the presidency because he became defendant of embezzlement (peculation in the penal code). The Senate maneuvered so that the justice official could not handle the judicial notice and Calheiros refused to sign it.

The biggest implicated company, Odebrecht kept an entire department to coordinate the payment of bribes to politicians. In the Car Wash Operation, officers seized several electronic spreadsheets linking the payments to nicknames. Every corrupt politician received a nickname based on physical characteristics, public trajectory, personal infos, owned cars/boats, origin place or generic preferences. Renan Calheiro's nickname was 'Athlete' and 'Justice', referring to his morning routine of jogging and his position as president of Senate's Commission of Constitution and Justice.

Notes

References

External links

 Official website 
 http://www.protestosbrasil.org/Videos/Peticao-de-saida-de-Renan-Calheiros-e-entregue-forarenan-20 

|-

|-

1955 births
Brazilian Democratic Movement politicians
Living people
People from Alagoas
Presidents of the Federal Senate (Brazil)
Members of the Chamber of Deputies (Brazil) from Alagoas
Members of the Legislative Assembly of Alagoas
Brazilian politicians convicted of crimes